Ljubodrag Dimić (20 February 1956, Zemun) is a Serbian historian, university professor and since 2012 member of Serbian Academy of Sciences and Arts. His primary fields of study are: history of former Yugoslavia, history of the Cold War, modern political, social and cultural history of Serbia and contemporary national history of Serbian people.

Biography 
Ljubodrag Dimić was born in 1956, in the city of Zemun near Belgrade, capital of Serbia and former Yugoslavia. He graduated history at the University of Belgrade Faculty of Philosophy in (1980), completed master studies in (1985) ("Agitprop phase of cultural policy in Serbia 1945-1952") and doctoral studies in (1993) ("Cultural Policy in the Kingdom of Yugoslavia 1929-1941"). Since 1981 he worked as an assistant researcher in Institute for recent history of Serbia in Belgrade. In 1985 he was transferred to the History Department of Faculty of Philosophy (University of Belgrade) where he worked as an assistant professor, and since 1998 as a professor, holding the char for the History of Yugoslavia. From 2003 to 2005 he was the head of the History Department.

Since 2001 he led the "Commission for Truth and Reconciliation" founded by the President of Federal Republic of Yugoslavia. He is member of the Board for the 20th century history (Serbian Academy of Sciences and Arts). He is also one of the founders of the Center for Contemporary History of Southeastern Europe, and head of the Center for History of Yugoslavia and the Cold War. He is member of editorial boards of several historical journals. He is also an honorary member of The Cold War Studies Centre of the London School of Economics and Political Science.

He studied and conducted research work in London, Prague, Braunschweig, Moscow, Ekaterinburg and Paris. He participated in the work of various of scientific conferences in Serbia and abroad. He is author of several books, editor of several volumes of historical material, writer of history textbooks, and also the author of more than 220 scientific papers. In 2012 he was elected corresponding member Serbian Academy of Sciences and Arts.

Bibliography 
Main works: 
 
 
 
 
 
 
 
 
 
 
 
 
 
 
 
 
 
 
  (Serbian edition)
  (English edition)
  (German edition)
  (Russian edition)

Other works

See also 
 List of Serbian historians
 List of SANU members

References

Literature 
 "Димић Љубодраг", in: Енциклопедија српске историографије (Encyclopedia of Serbian Historiography), Београд 1997, pp. 352.

External links 
 Professor Ljubodrag Dimić
 Belgrade University, History Department: Ljubodrag Dimić

1956 births
Living people
20th-century Serbian historians
Historians of Serbia
Members of the Serbian Academy of Sciences and Arts
University of Belgrade Faculty of Philosophy alumni
21st-century Serbian historians